With Women: Midwives experiences: from shift work to continuity of care is the fourth book from Australian writer David Vernon.

The book is an edited anthology of midwives' experiences of moving from providing care in a shift work environment to providing care in a continuity-of-care model.  The experiences described are diverse, ranging from descriptions of workplace bullying and abuse to autonomous practice within a team environment working with obstetricians.

The book has a preface written by Sheila Kitzinger, a foreword by Dr Sally Tracy, and conclusions written by Justine Caines and Dr Jenny Gamble.

The book was released on 31 May 2007.

External links
With Women website
David Vernon's Home Page

Works about childbirth
Health and wellness books
Works about human pregnancy